Tsuruda Dam is a dam in Kagoshima Prefecture, Japan, completed in 1965.

References 

Dams in Kagoshima Prefecture
Dams completed in 1965